Collard is a group of certain loose-leafed cultivars of Brassica oleracea, the same species as many common vegetables including cabbage (Capitata group) and broccoli (Italica group). Collard is generally described as part of the Acephala (kale) cultivar group, but gets its own variety as Brassica oleracea var. viridis. The name "collard" comes from the word "colewort" (a medieval term for non-heading brassica crops).

The plants are grown as a food crop for their large, dark-green, edible leaves, which are cooked and eaten as vegetables, mainly in Zambia, Kashmir, Brazil, Portugal, Zimbabwe, South Africa, the American South, Tanzania, Uganda, Kenya, the Balkans, and northern Spain. Collard greens have been eaten for at least 2,000 years, with evidence showing that the ancient Greeks cultivated several types of the plant.

Description 
The term collard has been used to include many non-heading Brassica oleracea crops. While American collards are best placed in the Viridis crop group, the Acephala cultivar group is also used ("without a head" in Greek) referring to a lack of close-knit core of leaves (a "head") like cabbage does, making collards more tolerant of high humidity levels and less susceptible to fungal diseases. The plant is a biennial where winter frost occurs; some varieties may be perennial in warmer regions. It has an upright stalk, often growing over two feet tall and up to six feet for the Portuguese cultivars. Popular cultivars of collard greens include 'Georgia Southern', 'Vates', 'Morris Heading', 'Blue Max', 'Top Bunch', 'Butter Collard' (couve manteiga), couve tronchuda, and Groninger Blauw. In Africa it is commonly known as sukuma (East Africa), muriwo or umBhida (Southern Africa).

Cultivation 

The plant is commercially cultivated for its thick, slightly bitter, edible leaves. They are available year-round, but are tastier and more nutritious in the cold months, after the first frost. For best texture, the leaves are picked before they reach their maximum size, at which stage they are thicker and are cooked differently from the new leaves. Age does not affect flavor. 

Flavor and texture also depend on the cultivar; the couve manteiga and couve tronchuda are especially appreciated in Brazil and Portugal. The large number of varieties grown in the USA decreased as people moved to towns after World War II, leaving only five varieties commonly in cultivation. However, seeds of many varieties remained in use by individual farmers, growers and seed savers as well as within US government seed collections. In the Appalachian region of the Southern United States, cabbage collards, characterized by yellow-green leaves and a partially heading structure are more popular than the dark-green non-heading types in the coastal South. There have been projects from the early 2000s to both preserve seeds of uncommon varieties and also enable more varieties to return to cultivation.

Nutritional information 

Raw collard greens are 90% water, 6% carbohydrates, 3% protein, and contain negligible fat (table). Like kale, collard greens contain substantial amounts of vitamin K (388% of the Daily Value, DV) in a  serving. Collard greens are rich sources (20% or more of DV) of vitamin A, vitamin C, and manganese, and moderate sources of calcium and vitamin B6. A  reference serving of cooked collard greens provides  of food energy. Some collard cultivars may be abundant sources of aliphatic glucosinolates, such as glucoraphanin.

Culinary use

East Africa 
Collard greens are known as sukuma in Swahilli and are one of the most common vegetables in East Africa. Sukuma is mainly lightly sauteed in oil until tender, flavoured with onions and seasoned with salt, and served either as the main accompaniment or as a side dish with meat or fish. In Congo, Tanzania and Kenya (East Africa), thinly sliced collard greens are the main accompaniments of a popular dish known as sima or ugali (a maize flour cake).

Southern and Eastern Europe
Collards have been cultivated in Europe for thousands of years with references to the Greeks and Romans back to the 1st Century. In Montenegro, Dalmatia and Herzegovina, collard greens, locally known as raštika or raštan, were traditionally one of the staple vegetables. It is particularly popular in the winter, stewed with smoked mutton (kaštradina) or cured pork, root vegetables and potatoes. Known in Turkey as kara lahana ("dark cabbage"), it is a staple in the Black Sea area.

Southern United States 
Collard greens are a staple vegetable in Southern U.S. cuisine. They are often prepared with other similar green leaf vegetables, such as spinach, kale, turnip greens, and mustard greens in the dish called "mixed greens". Typically used in combination with collard greens are smoked and salted meats (ham hocks, smoked turkey drumsticks, smoked turkey necks, pork neckbones, fatback or other fatty meat), diced onions, vinegar, salt, and black pepper, white pepper, or crushed red pepper, and some cooks add a small amount of sugar. Traditionally, collards are eaten on New Year's Day, along with black-eyed peas or field peas and cornbread, to ensure wealth in the coming year. Cornbread is used to soak up the "pot liquor", a nutrient-rich collard broth. Collard greens may also be thinly sliced and fermented to make a collard sauerkraut that is often cooked with flat dumplings. Landrace collard in-situ genetic diversity and ethnobotany are subjects of research for citizen-science groups.

Zimbabwe 
In Zimbabwe, collard greens are known as umbhida in Ndebele and muriwo in Shona. Due to the climate, the plant thrives under almost all conditions, with most people growing it in their gardens. It is commonly eaten with sadza (ugali in East Africa, pap in South Africa, and polenta in Italy) as part of the staple food. Umbhida is normally wilted in boiling water before being fried and combined with sautéed onions or tomato. Some (more traditionally, the Shona people) add beef, pork and other meat to the umbhida mix for a type of stew. Most people eat umbhida on a regular basis in Zimbabwe, as it is economical and can be grown with little effort in home gardens.

Brazil and Portugal 

In Portuguese and Brazilian cuisine, collard greens (or couve) are a common accompaniment to fish and meat dishes. They make up a standard side dish for feijoada, a popular pork and beans-style stew. These Brazilian and Portuguese cultivars are likely members of a distinct non-heading cultivar group of Brassica oleracea, specifically the Tronchuda Group.

Thinly-sliced collard greens are also a main ingredient of a popular Portuguese soup, the caldo verde ("green broth").

Kashmir Valley 

In Kashmir, collard greens (haakh) are included in most meals. Leaves are harvested by pinching in early spring when the dormant buds sprout and give out tender leaves known as kaanyil haakh. When the extending stem bears alternate leaves in quick succession during the growing season, older leaves are harvested periodically. In late autumn, the apical portion of the stem is removed along with the whorled leaves. 
There are several dishes made with haakh. A common dish eaten with rice is haak rus, a soup of whole collard leaves cooked simply with water, oil, salt, green chilies and spices.

In slavery in the United States 
During slavery, collards were one of the most common plants grown in kitchen gardens and were used to supplement the rations provided by plantation owners. Greens were widely used because the plants could last through the winter weather and could withstand the heat of a southern summer even more so than spinach or lettuce.

In United States culture 
In the United States, collard greens symbolize Southern culture and African-American culture and identity. For example, jazz composer and pianist, Thelonious Monk, sported a collard leaf in his lapel to represent his African-American heritage. In President Barack Obama's first state dinner, collard greens were included on the menu. Novelist and poet, Alice Walker used collards to reference the intersection of African-American heritage and black women. There have been many collard festivals that celebrate African-American identity, including those in Port Wentworth, Georgia (since 1997), East Palo Alto, California (since 1998), Columbus, Ohio (since 2010), and Atlanta, Georgia (since 2011). In 2010, the Latibah Collard Greens Museum opened in Charlotte, North Carolina.

Many explorers in the late nineteenth century have written about the pervasiveness of collards in Southern cooking particularly among black Americans. In 1869, Hyacinth, a traveler during the civil war, for example, observed that collards could be found anywhere in the south. In 1972, another observer, Stearns, echoed that sentiment claiming that collards were present in every black Southerner's garden. In 1883, Smith, a writer commented on the fact that there is no word or dish more popular among poorer whites and blacks than collard greens. The collard sandwich—consisting of fried cornbread, collard greens, and fatback—is a popular dish among the Lumbee people in Robeson County, North Carolina.

Pests 
The sting nematode, Belonolaimus gracilis and the awl nematode, Dolichodorus spp. are both ectoparasites that can injure collard. Root symptoms include stubby or coarse roots that are dark at the tips. Shoot symptoms include stunted growth, premature wilting, and chlorosis (Nguyen and Smart, 1975). Another species of the sting worm, Belonolaimus longicaudatus, is a pest of collards in Georgia and North Carolina (Robbins and Barker, 1973). B. longicaudatus is devastating to seedlings and transplants. As few as three nematodes per  of soil when transplanting can cause significant yield losses on susceptible plants. They are most common in sandy soils (Noling, 2012).

The stubby root nematodes Trichodorus and Paratrichodorus attach and feed near the tip of collard's taproots. The damage caused prevents proper root elongation leading to tight mats that could appear swollen, therefore resulting in a "stubby root" (Noling, 2012).

Several species of the root knot nematode Meloidogyne spp. infest collards. These include: M. javanica, M. incognita and M. arenaria. Second-stage juveniles attack the plant and settle in the roots. However, infestation seems to occur at lower populations compared to other cruciferous plants. Root symptoms include deformation (galls) and injury that prevent proper water and nutrient uptake. This could eventually lead to stunting, wilting and chlorosis of the shoots (Crow and Dunn, 2012).

The false root knot nematode Nacobbus aberrans has a wide host range of up to 84 species including many weeds. On Brassicas it has been reported in several states, including Nebraska, Wyoming, Utah, Colorado, Montana, South Dakota, and Kansas (Manzanilla-López et al., 2002). As a pest of collards, the degree of damage is dependent upon the nematode population in the soil.

Some collard cultivars exhibit resistance to bacterial leaf blight incited by Pseudomonas cannabina pv. alisalensis (Pca).

See also 
 Collard liquor

References

External links 

Brassica
Leaf vegetables
Cuisine of the Southern United States
Ethiopian cuisine
African cuisine